Don Alfonso de Orleans-Borbón y Ferrara-Pignatelli, Duke of Galliera (born 2 January 1968), is a Spanish aristocrat and the founder of Racing Engineering, a Spanish racing team. He became the 7th Duke of Galliera in 1997.

Life and career
He was born at Santa Cruz de Tenerife, Spain, as the elder son of Don Alonso de Orleans-Borbón y Parodi-Delfino (elder son of Prince Álvaro, Duke of Galliera, and Carla Parodi-Delfino) and Donna Emilia Ferrara-Pignatelli (daughter of Vincenzo Ferrara-Pignatelli, Prince of Strongoli, and Francesca Pulci-Doria).

Since his father died when he was seven, Alfonso inherited the title of Duke of Galliera from his grandfather, the 6th Duke of Galliera.

He was educated at Aiglon College in Switzerland.

He competed at the 1994 and 1995 24 Hours of Le Mans, finishing fourth in the GT2 class in his 1994 debut. Alfonso is the president of Racing Engineering, which he founded in 1999.

Marriage and family
Alfonso married the Belgian Véronique Goeders, daughter of Jean-Marie Goeders and Anne-Marie Grosjean, on 28 March 1994. After seven years of marriage, they divorced on 11 January 2001.

They had one child:
 Don Alonso Juan de Orleans-Borbón y Goeders (b. 15 July 1994 at Paris, France)

Ancestry

References

1968 births
Spanish racing drivers
24 Hours of Le Mans drivers
Motorsport team owners
People from Santa Cruz de Tenerife
Alfonso
Alfonso
Alfonso
Alfonso
Living people
NASCAR drivers
Racing Engineering drivers
Alumni of Aiglon College